Sleeping at Last is a musical project led by singer-songwriter and multi-instrumentalist Ryan O'Neal.  The project initially began in Wheaton, Illinois as a three-piece band with Ryan O'Neal as the lead singer and guitarist, his brother Chad O'Neal as the drummer, and Dan Perdue as the bassist. The band independently recorded their debut album, Capture in 2000, which they used to attract the attention of Smashing Pumpkins frontman Billy Corgan, who helped them get signed to a major record label, Interscope Records. The band released their only major label album, Ghosts in 2003, before going independent again and releasing Keep No Score in 2006, and Storyboards in 2009.

In the years following the release of their first four albums, both Chad O'Neal and Perdue would leave the band to pursue other interests. Ryan O'Neal chose to retain the use of the band's name for his solo work from that point on, but opted to focus on single songs and short EPs rather than traditional albums.

History

Early Years: Capture and Ghosts (1999–2003) 
Sleeping at Last was originally formed in 1999 in Wheaton, Illinois, and consisted of Ryan O'Neal, his brother Chad O'Neal (drummer), and Dan Perdue (bass guitarist). The group built a significant local following and opened for bands such as Kill Hannah and Plain White T's, attracting the attention of Billy Corgan, who got them signed to Interscope Records in 2002. Their major label debut, Ghosts, followed in 2003.

National touring ensued, first opening for Switchfoot, then for Billy Corgan's side project Zwan, Yellowcard, Something Corporate, The Format, and Bleu. They received airplay on Fuse TV and their song "Quicksand" was featured in the third season of Grey's Anatomy. Their third full-length, Keep No Score, was released independently.

Departure of Chad O'Neal and Storyboards, Yearbook (2008–2011) 
On November 29, 2008, it was announced that drummer Chad O'Neal would be moving on to pursue other interests. In 2009, the band independently released their Storyboards album, which featured a guest orchestral arrangement by the legendary Van Dyke Parks. On July 15, 2010 the band announced via their website that starting on October 1, 2010 until September 1, 2011 they would be releasing three songs on the first day of each month for one year, a project they named Yearbook. The songs were released on their website in twelve separate EPs named after the month in which they were released (e.g. January, February, etc.). As of December 8, 2011, all 12 EPs became available in one Yearbook box set for $45.00. On May 22, 2011 it was announced that bassist and keys player Dan Perdue would be stepping down to pursue other interests. The band will still continue as Sleeping at Last, with Ryan O'Neal being the only permanent member.

Yearbook songs "Homesick" and "Watermark" were featured in the ABC television show, Private Practice in Season 3 (2010), followed by "Yearbook" songs "Emphasis" and "Wires" being featured on Private Practice in Season 4 (2011). "Tethered" (also on "Yearbook") was featured in season 8 (2012) of the ABC television show Grey's Anatomy. "From the Ground Up" from Yearbook: December was featured in the season 7 finale of Bones.

On September 26, 2011 it was announced that a new Sleeping at Last song will be featured in the film, The Twilight Saga: Breaking Dawn – Part 1, with a song called "Turning Page", written exclusively for the film. "Turning Page" and "Turning Page (Instrumental)" appeared exclusively on The Twilight Saga: Breaking Dawn – Part 1 Original Motion Picture Soundtrack, released on November 8, 2011.

On June 6, 2012, Sleeping at Last released an 8-bit remix EP entitled "8-Bits". The EP is composed of one song from each of the last three Sleeping at Last studio albums and one song from the Yearbook project. The songs were remixed by Michael Carroll and Steven Padin from The Reign of Kindo. The EP was released for free on NoiseTrade.

Atlas project (2013–present) 
O'Neal teased his latest project on his blog in late 2012, showing an image with the date "12.12.12" on it. Two days before December 12 that year, O'Neal revealed the details of Atlas, what he described as "an ongoing series of [EP]s". In the blog post, O'Neal said that the artwork would "play a very special role in [the] project" and that he had turned to Geoff Benzing to "paint one painting for each of the 28+ songs".

In December 2013, the song "In the Embers" from the album Atlas: Light was used by Turner Classic Movies as the soundtrack for the 2013 version of "TCM Remembers," the network's annual tribute to actors, producers, and other filmmakers who died during the year. The lyrics of the song discuss leaving a legacy after death and compares the span of human lives to fireworks, stating that "till our temporary brilliance turns to ash, we pull apart the darkness while we can."

On January 30, 2014 the song "Sun" from the EP Atlas: Space 1 was used in the trailer for the book-based movie The Fault in Our Stars.

On July 8, 2014, Sleeping at Last released Atlas: Year One, a compilation of the previous year's six extended plays.

In 2014 the song "Light" from the album Atlas 1 was used on the OST of The Little Death.

On February 18, 2015, O'Neal announced, via his Facebook page, that Atlas: Year Two would be coming out in the spring of 2015. On April 2, O'Neal recorded two covers, "Today Has Been Okay" and "Chasing Cars", that were both used in the eleventh season of Grey's Anatomy. On May 18, the subscribers of Atlas: Year Two were able to listen to the first two songs, "Overture II" and "Life". It was released on iTunes on May 26. On June 13, O'Neal recorded an OST for the new upcoming movie Many Beautiful Things that was available on Spotify. On August 13, the group's song, "Countdowns" was the feature song at the end of the next to last episode of The Astronaut Wives Club – The Dark Side.  It played as the wives held their breath for Apollo 8 going around the back side of the moon and as the wives go their separate ways in life. On September 18, the first EP of Atlas: Year Two, Atlas: Life, was released on iTunes and Spotify.

On August 10, 2021, O'Neal announced on his blog that the first song of Atlas: Year 3, 'Overture III / Awake' would be coming out on the 24th of that month for those with subscriptions. It was released officially on iTunes on September 10, and in a blog post on that date he also announced that Elicia Edijanto would be doing the artwork for all of the songs in Atlas: Year 3.

Discography

Albums

Compilations

Extended plays

Singles

Members
Current
Ryan O'Neal – lead vocals, guitar, keys (1999–present)

Former
Dan Perdue – bass guitar, keyboard (1999–2011)
Chad O'Neal – drums (1999–2008)

In other media
In 2011, the song "Turning Page" appeared in The Twilight Saga: Breaking Dawn – Part 1.

Since 2013, ABC's drama Grey's Anatomy has used many Sleeping at Last songs.

2014, CW show The Vampire Diaries used their cover of "All Through the Night".

In 2015, Budweiser used the cover of "I’m Gonna Be (500 Miles)" from Covers, Vol. 1 in their Super Bowl Ad.

References

External links
 
 An interview with Ryan and Dan on Episode 34 of The Collision Podcast
http://lifechangingapparel.com/2011/01/30/life-changing-interview-sleeping-at-last/

1999 establishments in Illinois
Indie rock musical groups from Illinois
Musical groups established in 1999